The Day of the Beast is a 1995 Spanish-Italian black comedy film with horror elements co-written and directed by Álex de la Iglesia and starring Álex Angulo, Armando De Razza and Santiago Segura.

The plot concerns the unorthodox attempts of a Basque priest (Angulo) to avert the birth of the Antichrist in Madrid during Christmas Eve, teaming up with a metalhead (Segura) and an occult fraudster (De Razza). The film, marketed as "a satanic comedy", was well received by critics and audiences in Spain, and sparked interest in the director's filmography and style of directing.

It earned numerous accolades, including the Goya Award for Best Director for Álex de la Iglesia.

Plot summary 
Ángel, a Basque priest and professor of theology, confesses to another priest that he intends to commit as much evil as he can. The other priest is shocked until Ángel whispers his reasoning. When the other priest agrees to help him, a large cross falls and crushes him.

Ángel goes into downtown Madrid, committing various sins and crimes such as taking money from a homeless man, pushing a street performer over, and telling a dying man to go to Hell and stealing his wallet. He goes to a record store and meets José María, a self-described Satanist and heavy metal fan from the popular neighborhood of Carabanchel, who gives him a tape of the most "evil" band he can think of. José María puts Ángel up in his mother's boarding house where he lives with his mother, grandfather, and Mina, a woman he is attracted to that helps his mother with the business. Ángel then attempts to steal a book from a book store written by occult TV show host Professor Cavan, who he believes can tell him how to sell his soul to Satan. He tries to explain to the store manager his theory: a secret code in the Bible says that the Antichrist will be born at midnight on Christmas Eve, and he intends to sell his soul before the night is out to get into the birth ceremony and kill the Antichrist. The store manager does not believe him and he flees.

Ángel and José María team up to kidnap and tie up Cavan, who they intimidate into telling them how to complete a ritual in which Ángel can sell his soul to the Devil. The ritual requires the blood of a virgin, so Ángel first tries to get it from Cavan's girlfriend Susana, but after knocking her out by mistake, Cavan admits that she is not a virgin. Ángel then goes back to the boarding house, drugs Mina, and draws some of her blood, but José María's mother sees him and tries to kill him with a shotgun. Ángel escapes with some of the blood, but accidentally kills José María's mother in the process. Ángel, José María, and Cavan are able to burn a piece of paper, take LSD, and complete the ritual, which Cavan believes — like most of his "occult" practices" — is made up. However, a he-goat appears in the room and stands on its hind legs in front of Ángel, then disappears. Ángel then finds a message in the burnt scraps of paper in which the devil taunts him, not fooled by Ángel's actions. Ángel, José María, and Cavan flee the apartment when the police arrive on suspicion of Cavan's kidnapping.

Ángel and José María frantically drive around town looking for a sign to point Ángel in the right direction. Ángel first tries to get the information on the birth of the Antichrist out of a man giving a speech about the predictions of Nostradamus, resulting in a chase in which three men dressed as the Three Wise Men are shot by police by mistake. He then tries to find the information at a heavy metal show, but is beaten up by the attendees. Cavan goes on television and asks Ángel to call him, telling him that he's realized Ángel was right and he knows where the birth of the Antichrist will be.

Cavan points out that the devil uses his own markings, similar yet opposite to the Christian cross, in order to mock God, and points them toward a pair of buildings in the same shape of the devil's mark: the Gate of Europe. The three men engage in a fight with an extreme-right gang that has holed up there and has been seen throughout the film murdering homeless people and spray painting  everywhere. Their leader is revealed as the devil when he throws José María off the building to his death. The gang beats Cavan badly, but Ángel gets hold of a gun and kills the gang, which was also killing a baby who is the Antichrist. He then shoots the devil as well.

Some time later, another actor takes over Cavan's show, and Ángel and Cavan become homeless drifters; while Cavan constantly complains that they will never be able to tell anyone how they saved the world, Ángel simply misses José María, but has accepted the events as the duo's fate.

Cast

Production 
A Spanish-Italian 80%–20% co-production, the film was produced by Andrés Vicente Gómez' Iberoamericana Films Producción alongside Sogetel and M.G. S.R.L in collaboration with Sogepaq and Canal Plus España. It had a 300 million ₧ budget. A soundtrack for the film was released in Spain and Korea. It featured bands such as Ministry, HeadCrash, Pantera, Sugar Ray, and Def Con Dos.

Release 
The film opened in Spanish theatres on 20 October 1995. It grossed €4,367,321.

Reception
In a retrospective review of the film for Popoptiq, reviewer Ricky D. wrote, "Delirious, demented and diabolically funny, The Day of the Beast is essential viewing."

In a retrospective review for Daily Grindhouse, reviewer Johnny Donaldson wrote that The Day of the Beast "may not exactly be a traditional Christmas movie, even by the standards of the horror genre, but it’s a perfect one for those who want to thumb their noses at the “Christ” part of Christmas."

Accolades 

|-
| align = "center" rowspan = "14" | 1996 || rowspan = "14" | 10th Goya Awards || Best Film || Sogetel, Iberoamericana Films, M.G. S.R.L. ||  || rowspan = "14" | 
|-
| Best Director || Álex de la Iglesia || 
|-
| Best Actor || Álex Angulo || 
|-
| Best Original Screenplay || Jorge Guerricaechevarría, Álex de la Iglesia || 
|-
| New Actor || Santiago Segura || 
|-
| Best Art Direction || Arturo García "Biafra", José Luis Arrizabalaga || 
|-
| Best Cinematography || Flavio Martínez Labiano || 
|-
| Best Editing || Teresa Font || 
|-
| Best Production Supervision || Carmen Martínez || 
|-
| Best Original Score || Battista Lena || 
|-
| Best Sound || Carlos Garrido, Gilles Ortion, José Antonio Bermúdez, Miguel Rejas, Ray Gillon || 
|-
| Best Makeup and Hairstyles || José Antonio Sánchez, José Quetglás, Mercedes Guillot || 
|-
| Best Special Effects || Juan Tomicic, Manuel Horrillo, Reyes Abades || 
|-
| Best Costume Design || Estíbaliz Markiegi || 
|}

See also 
 List of Spanish films of 1995
 Def Con Dos appear as Satannica and provide part of the soundtrack

References

Bibliography

External links 
 
 
 

1995 films
Spanish black comedy films
Italian black comedy films
1990s comedy horror films
Films directed by Álex de la Iglesia
Films set in Madrid
Films shot in Madrid
1990s Italian-language films
Latin-language films
Spanish Christmas films
1990s Spanish-language films
Films with screenplays by Jorge Guerricaechevarría
1990s Christmas horror films
Demons in film
1995 comedy films
1990s Spanish films